The 2005 West Virginia Mountaineers football team completed the season with an 11–1 record.  The Mountaineers won their third consecutive Big East title with a conference record of 7–0. They ended the season with a 38–35 Sugar Bowl win over Georgia.

Preseason
The 2005 season followed a disappointing 2004 campaign, where the Mountaineers started the season with National Championship expectations only to finish the season 8-4. Despite a number of starters returning on defense, the question marks on offense lead many to think the '05 season was going to be a rebuilding year with most national publications picking the Mountaineers to finish behind Louisville and Pitt or lower. With QB Rasheed Marshall and RB K.J. Harris leaving, the quarterback and halfback positions were open. Adam Bednarik and redshirt-freshman Pat White were competing for the spot, with Coach Rich Rodriguez opting to use a rotation that allowed them both to play. It marked the first season for the "new" Big East, welcoming Louisville, Cincinnati, and South Florida into the league following Boston College leaving to join former members Virginia Tech and Miami in the ACC, and Temple getting kicked out of the league.

Schedule

Roster
Position key

Game summaries

at Syracuse

    
    
    
    
    

The 2005 West Virginia Mountaineers opened the football season at Syracuse. Syracuse was playing its first game under new head coach Greg Robinson. The Mountaineers committed 5 turnovers, including 4 lost fumbles, but managed to hold on to a lead for a 15–7 win. Syracuse started the scoring with a 5-yard touchdown run by tailback Damien Rhodes.

West Virginia tied the game at 7 with Eric Wicks's 32-yard interception return for a touchdown. Right before halftime, the Mountaineers had a chance to take a 10–7 lead, but freshman place-kicker Pat McAfee missed a 47-yard field goal wide right. He redeemed himself later with a 33-yard field goal with 5:33 left in the third quarter.

With just over 8 minutes left in the game, West Virginia's Ernest Hunter tackled Perry Patterson in the end zone for a safety to increase the lead to 12–7. On West Virginia's next possession they added a 26-yard field goal by McAfee with 3 minutes left. The win brought the Mountaineers record to 1–0, and the Orangemen fell to 0–1. The win increased WVU's streak to 4 wins over Syracuse.

Statistics

Wofford

    
    
    
    
    
    

Backup quarterback Pat White ran for 107 yards and a touchdown to lead West Virginia to a 35-7 victory over I-AA Wofford.  West Virginia finished the game with over 500 yards of total offense, and no turnovers. 

Statistics

at Maryland

Backup quarterback Pat White directed three fourth-quarter touchdown drives, and West Virginia ripped Maryland's defense for 301 yards rushing in a 31–19 victory. Freshman Jason Gwaltney scored two touchdowns for the Mountaineers (3–0), who had lost three straight at Maryland (1–2) since 1997. West Virginia let a 15-point lead dwindle to 21–19 before Gwaltney scored on a 15-yard run with 4:56 left. The Mountaineers then recovered a fumble by Maryland quarterback Sam Hollenbach, and Pat McAfee kicked a 40-yard field goal to make it 31–19 with 2:18 remaining. White went 3-for-5 for 29 yards, but guided an offense that amassed 24 points and 144 yards in the final 15 minutes.

Statistics

East Carolina

The previous 3 times the Mountaineers played East Carolina were blow-outs, 37–17, 48–7, and 56–23. This one appeared to be another one after the Mountaineers led 20–6 at half-time. The offense looked terrible the entire game, as they turned the ball over 4 times. Backup quarterback Pat White tossed two interceptions and Adam Bednarik threw one and fumbled once before leaving the game with a knee injury in the first quarter. The defense had to constantly defend short fields, after turnovers in their own territory. The defense only allowed 287 yards and 1 touchdown in the entire game. West Virginia failed to score a single second half point, and managed to escape 20–15.

Statistics

Virginia Tech

3rd ranked Virginia Tech clashed with West Virginia, at Mountaineer Field in a showdown of two 4–0 unbeaten teams. Virginia Tech had a monster game from their star quarterback, Marcus Vick. The junior completed 15 of 17 passes for 177 yards, and rushed for 74 yards on 12 carries. Virginia Tech jumped out to an early 10–0 lead, through a West Virginia turnover. Virginia Tech played a solid game, converting 10 out of 15 third down attempts, and having only one turnover. With Virginia Tech leading 24–17 late in the fourth quarter, a touchdown run sealed the deal for the Mountaineers who fell to 4–1 on the season.  True freshman Steve Slaton was a bright spot for the Mountaineers, rushing for 90 yards on 11 carries. 

Statistics

at Rutgers

Steve Slaton ran for a career-high 139 yards and one touchdown to help West Virginia beat Rutgers 27–14. Jason Gwaltney added 57 yards rushing for West Virginia which beat Rutgers for the 11th straight time. West Virginia rushed for 236 yards against a depleted Rutgers defense, which was without three starters—linebacker Terry Bynes, defensive back Jason Nugent and end Eric Foster.

Statistics

Louisville

In one of the best games of the year, The Louisville Cardinals clashed with the West Virginia Mountaineers who were 5–1. Louisville completely dominated the first half of play racing to a 17–0 lead. West Virginia finally got on the board in the third quarter, when Bednarik hit freshman Steve Slaton on a 14-yard screen-pass for a touchdown. Louisville answered with another touchdown in the third quarter, to take a 24–7 lead after 3 quarters.  Early in the 4th quarter starting QB Adam Bednarik left the game with a leg injury and was replaced by Pat White, which proved to be the spark the offense needed.

With just over 8 minutes left in the game, Steve Slaton scored a rushing touchdown to make the score 24–14. With 4:35 left in the game, Pat McAfee kicked a 35-yard field goal to trim the margin to 7. WVU's defense held, and the Mountaineers came back on offense again. Steve Slaton scored with a minute to go to tie the game at 24–24, and send the game into overtime.  Starting in the third OT teams are forced to go for two following a TD, Pat White hit Jalloh on a pass which ended up being the deciding points.  Louisville responded with a Michael Bush touchdown. On the conversion Brian Brohm, unable to find anyone open, attempted to scramble for the conversion but was tackled short, preserving the WVU victory and giving the Mountaineers the inside track for the conference's BCS berth.

Statistics

Connecticut

Pat White ran for two touchdowns and threw for another in his first start, leading No. 18 West Virginia to a 45–13 win over Connecticut. West Virginia showed no signs of sluggishness from an 18-day layoff. The Mountaineers built a 35–3 halftime lead, getting a pair of touchdowns following turnovers. The defense limited UConn to 12 rushing yards and 129 overall, the fewest allowed by West Virginia in three seasons. UConn had one of Division I-A's top defenses statistically, but four of its opponents have a combined record of 3–29. The nation's ninth-best rushing attack used a rotation of backs to compile 228 yards against the Huskies. White frustrated UConn with his legs and his arm. He ran for 63 yards on 12 carries.

White hit Brandon Myles with a 20-yard TD pass early in the second quarter. On the first play of the ensuing drive, West Virginia's Warren Young recovered a fumble at the UConn 20.

White then leveled two UConn players on a block that saved teammate Steve Slaton from a big loss. Two plays later, White eluded three defenders on a bootleg run to the right and scored from 14 yards out for a 28–3 lead.

at Cincinnati

Pat White ran for 111 yards, taking off on quarterback draws that set up Steve Slaton's four touchdowns and a 38–0 victory over Cincinnati. White, Slaton and one of the nation's toughest defenses led the Mountaineers to their most lopsided victory of the season and their first shutout since 2002. White spent the night tormenting the nation's youngest defense. He ran straight up the middle on draws, turned upfield on option fakes, and took off on passing plays. The Mountaineers forced four turnovers and prevented Cincinnati from getting closer than the West Virginia 37-yard line until the final play of the game.

Pittsburgh

Pat White ran for 220 yards on 23 carries to break the Big East rushing record for a quarterback, leading the No. 11 Mountaineers to a 45–13 victory over Pittsburgh. White ran for two touchdowns and passed for another.
The day began with massive snowfall that forced the game to be played on a frozen field with swirling snow flurries and a 7-degree wind chill. West Virginia clinched at least a tie for the Big East title and avenged a 16–13 loss to Pitt the year before in the Backyard Brawl.
White broke the conference quarterback rushing record of 210 yards, set by Michael Vick against Boston College in 2000. White also threw for 41 yards. Steve Slaton rushed for 179 yards on 34 carries to help the Mountaineers finish with 451 total yards on the ground. Slaton ran for two TDs and caught a scoring pass.

at South Florida

Pat White ran for 177 yards and two touchdowns, leading West Virginia to a 28–13 victory over South Florida in the 11th-ranked Mountaineers' final tuneup for a Bowl Championship Series appearance.
Nine days after running for 220 yards against Pittsburgh to break the Big East rushing record for a quarterback, White was just as impressive in helping the conference champions finish unbeaten in league play for the first time since 1993.
The redshirt freshman scored on second-half runs of 65 and 76 yards and finished with his fourth game with at least 100 yards rushing. He also completed 5 of 10 passes for 89 yards and a touchdown as the Mountaineers amassed 394 yards of total offense—305 of that on the ground.

The victory was the sixth straight for West Virginia (10–1, 7–0) and gave the Mountaineers at least 10 wins in a season for the first time since 1993 and just the fifth time in school history.

The dominating performance dispelled any notion that the Mountaineers lacked motivation to win their regular-season finale after wrapping up the Big East title and the league's automatic BCS berth when USF (6–5, 4–3) lost at Connecticut the week before.

Steve Slaton rushed for 89 yards and one touchdown for the Mountaineers, and West Virginia's defense limited Big East rushing leader Andre Hall to 75 yards on 20 carries for South Florida.

vs. Georgia (Sugar Bowl)

The Sugar Bowl, the second BCS bowl, and the final game of six played on January 2, 2006, was contested at the Georgia Dome in Atlanta, having been, like the New Orleans Bowl, displaced from the Louisiana Superdome by Hurricane Katrina. West Virginia, representing the Big East as conference champion, upset Georgia, the winner of the SEC championship game, 38–35. Georgia was looking for its third straight win in Atlanta in as many appearances, having won its last regular season game (against rival Georgia Tech on the Tech campus) and the SEC championship game (over LSU) at the Georgia Dome, located near the Bulldogs' Athens, Georgia campus, but West Virginia took a 28–0 lead in the game's first 16 minutes and withstood a furious Georgia comeback before scoring late in the fourth quarter to secure the win. Mountaineers freshman running back Steve Slaton began a career day early, running for a 52-yard score just 2:48 into the game en route to accumulating 204 yards on 26 carries against a Bulldogs defense that entered the game having allowed only 3.5 yards per carry. On the subsequent West Virginia possession, freshman quarterback Pat White accounted 56 yards of a 64-yard scoring drive, connecting with wide receiver Darius Reynaud for a three-yard touchdown pass; Reynaud caught six passes for 50 yards on the day. Just two plays into the next Bulldogs drive, running back Danny Ware lost the first of what would be three Georgia fumbles on the day, and West Virginia took just five plays to go 26 yards, scoring a touchdown on a 13-yard Reynaud run. The Mountaineers defense stymied an additional Georgia drive and forced a fumble by Georgia quarterback D.J. Shockley, setting up a 50-yard drive that culminated in Slaton's second touchdown scamper, an 18-yarder that gave West Virginia a 28-point lead just 15:50 into the game. Shockley began to have success against the Mountaineers defense in the second quarter, completing three straight passes for a total of 46 yards before running back Kregg Lumpkin, who finished the day with 67 yards on nine carries, scored from 34 yards to put Georgia on the board. After their defense forced a West Virginia punt, the Bulldogs went 91 yards in just six plays, with Thomas Brown's scoring on a 52-yard run; Brown has held largely in check the remainder of the game, totaling only 78 yards on nine carries. A long run by West Virginia fullback Owen Schmitt, who finished the day having run for 80 yards on nine carries, set up a 27-yard Pat McAfee field goal, but Shockley, who finished the day having completed 20 of 33 passes for 278 yards and having gained 62 yards on eight carries, drove his team 80 yards in under five minutes and hit wide receiver Leonard Pope, who caught six passes for 52 yards on the day, from four yards to cut the West Virginia halftime lead to 10 points. After combining to give up more than 600 yards in total offense in the first half, both defenses tightened in the second half and although Brown lost a fumble to the Mountaineers, neither team managed a score until 1:44 remained in the third quarter when Shockley hit A.J. Bryant for a 34-yard touchdown to bring the Bulldogs to within three points. White continued to play well through air and on the ground in the fourth quarter, though, and led his team on an 80-yard drive that ended when Slaton ran for a 52-yard touchdown and once more extended the West Virginia lead to ten. For the game, White completed 11 of 14 passes for 124 yards—completing four passes for 64 yards to senior Brandon Myles, his leading receiver—but also added 79 yards on 24 carries in contributing to his team's 386-yard rushing performance. Shockley drove his team once more, connecting with Mohamed Massaquoi, whom he four times for 43 yards on the day, to convert a crucial third down and then finding Bryan McClendon, who caught three balls for 72 yards, on a 43-yard scoring drive. The Bulldogs defense held but West Virginia punter Phil Brady successfully carried out a fake punt and ran for a first down, allowing the Mountaineers, behind Slaton and White, to run out the clock, run their season to 11–1, and prevent the Big East from going winless in four bowls; South Florida, Rutgers, and Louisville had all lost earlier. The game was the final of three games hosted by the Georgia Dome in four days; the Chick-fil-A Peach Bowl was held on December 30, and an NFL contest between the Carolina Panthers and Atlanta Falcons was played on January 1, which the Panthers won 44–11. The game returned to New Orleans in 2007.

Statistics

Rankings

Statistics

Team

Offense

References

West Virginia
West Virginia Mountaineers football seasons
Sugar Bowl champion seasons
Big East Conference football champion seasons
West Virginia Mountaineers football